Kenton B. Onstad (born July 17, 1953) is the former Democratic-NPL Minority Leader in the North Dakota House of Representatives and was one of the two members who represents District 4, which is composed of Mountrail County, the Fort Berthold Indian Reservation, portions of Mercer County and a northern portion of Dunn County.

Onstad served as Minority Leader from 2001 until his electoral defeat in 2016. Prior to that, he has been Assistant Minority Leader as well as alderman for Parshall City Council and officer for Booner Township. He is the owner/manager of a farm and also employed by Mountrail-Williams Electric Cooperative. Onstad's professional experience includes President of Parshall 2000 Incorporated; teaching in the Parshall School District from 1975–1983; being an owner/manager in farming since 1983; and working for Mountrail-Williams Electric Cooperative since 1998. He earned his BS in Mathematics from Dickinson State University in 1975.
Onstad and his wife, Kathy, have three children; Sarah, Jaclyn, Andrew.

References

External links
 – Minority Leader
 – Assistant Minority Leader
North Dakota Legislative Assembly – Representative Kenton Onstad official ND Senate website
Project Vote Smart – Representative Kenton B. Onstad (ND) profile
Follow the Money – Kenton Onstad
2006 2004 2000 campaign contributions
North Dakota Democratic-NPL Party – Representative Kenton Onstad profile

1953 births
Living people
American people of Norwegian descent
People from Minot, North Dakota
North Dakota city council members
People from Mountrail County, North Dakota
Dickinson State University alumni
Farmers from North Dakota
21st-century American politicians
Democratic Party members of the North Dakota House of Representatives